KMGi Group is a private holding of Internet companies, which includes KMGi Studios, Intuic, TransparentBusiness, and WikiExperts.

History 
Founded in 1997 in New York City by Alex Konanykhin, Nikolai Mentchokov, and Elena Gratcheva as an advertising agency. The company later shifted focus to work primarily on website design. The company name is based on the initials of the founders' last names. The company's first headquarters were located in the Empire State Building. At that time, many of the company's employees were Russian. The company began with 35 employees based in one physical location, but has since moved to the use of a virtual office, using employees from different countries instead of just one location.

Webmercials 
In 1998 KMGi introduced the use of Macromedia’s Flash Technology for online advertising. Alex Mentchoukov, the agency's chief creative officer, created a way of using vector-based graphics for Web advertisements without using as much bandwidth as pixel-based graphics. From this work, KMGi became one of the first companies to create animated, television-style "webmercials" for the Internet. In August 2000, KMGi partnered with Unicast to move from using the interstitial format for its commercials to the superstitial format, which reduced the slow-down effect of browser downloads. In 2002 the KMGi website then became the first to be carried entirely in Flash Lingo. KMGi's webmercial and other services clients have included Volvo, Pfizer, DuPont, Best Western, Verizon, and Macromedia. In addition, the agency has produced advertisements for companies including Coca-Cola, Lexus, and the New York Post.

Software and services 
In 2000, the company began selling retail software and by 2004, KMGi had $1.4 million in sales of software. Part of the company's marketing plan included the distribution of free anti-spam software to consumers who watched a 30-second commercial. KMGi also created WebPresentations, a producer of online product demonstrations. In 2004 KMGi released SeePassword, a program that allowed users to recover hidden or lost passwords from Internet Explorer. In 2005, KMGi formed a subsidiary called Publicity Guaranteed, public relations firm. In 2010, KMGi then formed a subsidiary called WikiExperts, which creates and repairs English Wikipedia articles for companies or advises them on how to create articles themselves. At the time of WikiExperts' creation, Konanykhin suggested that Wikipedia should use advertising to generate more revenue and pay "qualified experts" to improve its content.

In 2011 KMGi released TransparentBusiness software, which allows employers or clients to monitor the activity of those working for them on computers via a cloud-supported activity monitor and screenshots. In 2012 TransparentBusiness received the PC World Latin America Rising Star Award for the Best Cloud Computing Solution for Enterprise.

References

External links 
  Official Website

Advertising agencies of the United States
Public relations companies of the United States
Companies established in 1997
Companies based in New York City
1997 establishments in New York City